The Canadian Amateur (TCA) is a bimonthly amateur radio enthusiast magazine published in Canada. The magazine is published in English and French and draws its subscription base of 4,500 members primarily from Canada. The magazine is published six times per year by the Radio Amateurs of Canada.  It is a membership journal that is included in membership with the RAC. The headquarters is in Ottawa.

It has been published since at least 1989.

References 

Amateur radio magazines
magazine
Bi-monthly magazines published in Canada
Hobby magazines published in Canada
English-language magazines
French-language magazines published in Canada
Magazines with year of establishment missing
Magazines published in Ottawa